The 1932–33 Connecticut Aggies men's basketball team represented Connecticut Agricultural College, now the University of Connecticut, in the 1932–33 collegiate men's basketball season. The Aggies completed the season with a 4–12 overall record. The Aggies were members of the New England Conference, where they ended the season with a 0–4 record. The Aggies played their home games at Hawley Armory in Storrs, Connecticut, and were led by second-year head coach John J. Heldman, Jr.

Schedule 

|-
!colspan=12 style=""| Regular Season

Schedule Source:

References 

UConn Huskies men's basketball seasons
Connecticut
1932 in sports in Connecticut
1933 in sports in Connecticut